Anar-e Shirin-e Seh (also Romanized as Anār-e Shīrīn-e Seh; also known as Anār-e Shīrīn) is a village in Maskun Rural District, Jebalbarez District, Jiroft County, Kerman Province, Iran. At the 2006 census, its population was 42, in 12 families.

References 

Populated places in Jiroft County